Maxbilt Theatre is a historic theater located at Fleischmanns, Delaware County, New York. It was built in 1929, and is a two-story, brick, concrete block, and stucco building.  It measures 65 feet wide and 185 feet deep, and consists of three sections: a five-bay by three-bay main block, (housing the lobby, storefronts, projector rooms and apartments above), a large auditorium (housing the theater), and a one-story, rectangular concrete block rear section.  It is an intact example of a small regional theater built during the heyday of the Catskills resort era.

It was added to the National Register of Historic Places in 2014.

References

Theatres on the National Register of Historic Places in New York (state)
Theatres completed in 1929
Buildings and structures in Delaware County, New York
National Register of Historic Places in Delaware County, New York